Derrynoose is a village and civil parish in south County Armagh, Northern Ireland, 4.5 km south-west of Keady.

The village lies partly in the townland of Mullyard (in the civil parish of Derrynoose) and partly in the townland of Crossnamoyle (in the civil parish of Keady). The civil parish is situated in the historic baronies of Armagh and Tiranny and is within the Armagh City and District Council area.

History
Derrynoose was one of several Catholic border villages in Armagh that would have been transferred to the Irish Free State had the recommendations of the Irish Boundary Commission been enacted in 1925.

Demography
Derrynoose is classed as Rural according to the Statistical Classification and Delineation of Settlements Report 2005.
On Census Day 29 April 2001 the resident population of Derrynoose ward was 2,956. Of this population,
30.1% were under 16 years old and 12.3% were aged 60 and above.
84.3% identified as Catholic and 15.4% as Protestant or other Christian background.

Services 
The nearest hospital to Derrynoose is Daisy Hill Hospital. Primary education is provided by Our Lady's & St Mochua's Primary School.

The local GAA club, St Mochua's (Cumann Naomh Mochua), is the main sporting outlet for the community and plays football in the Intermediate league and championship in Armagh and hurling in the Junior league and championship. The local community centre and GAA club use the same building. It also includes a bar.

There was formerly a locally owned shop and post office. There are a few local businesses including A&M Commercials, The Derryvale Inn pub, Albert Keenea Coal & Oil Armagh Trading Ltd, and M&S Freight Forwarding Ltd.

Places of interest
Places of interest include "The Standing Stone", St Mochua's Well, "The Stations of The Cross", St Mochua's Chapel, "The Old Chapel Ruins and Graveyard", The Emigration Stone and Listrakelt Fort. The site of the medieval parish church is marked by the ruins of a church built about 1622 in the townland of Listarkelt.

Civil parish of Derrynoose
The civil parish is sometimes known as Maddan, where the present Church of Ireland church is located. The civil parish contains the village of Derrynoose.

Townlands
The civil parish contains the following townlands:

Ballynagolan
Brootally
Carnagh
Cargalisgorran
Carrickabolie
Carryhugh
Cormeen
Crossbane
Crossreagh (also known as Doohat)
Dernalea
Derryhennet
Doohat (also known as Crossreagh)
Drumacanver
Drumgar
Drumgreenagh
Drumherney
Drumhirk
Drummeland
Drumnahavil
Farnaloy
Fergort
Kilcreevy Etra
Kilcreevy Otra
Killyreavy
Knockrevan
Lisdrumbrughas
Lisglynn
Lislea
Lissagally
Listarkelt
Maddan
Maghery Kilcrany
Mowillin
Mullyard
Roughan
Rowan
Tamlaght
Tivnacree
Tullycallidy
Tullyhirm

See also
List of civil parishes of County Armagh

References

Villages in County Armagh